Alison Mary Houston Patrick  (1921–2009) was an Australian historian and scholar of the French Revolution. In 1977 she was the first woman elected head of the Department of History at the University of Melbourne.

Early life and education 
Alison Mary Houston Hamer was born on 24 March 1921 in Kew, Victoria. She was the third child and only daughter of former nurse Nancy (née McLuckie) and solicitor Hubert Hamer. Her brothers included Sir Rupert Hamer, Premier of Victoria and David Hamer, federal Liberal politician. She was educated at St Catherine's School in Toorak and then graduated with a BA from the University of Melbourne in 1942 and was awarded the Dwight Prize. Her PhD thesis was published by Johns Hopkins University Press in 1972.

Career 
Patrick's career as an academic at the University of Melbourne began in 1946 when she was employed in a part-time role. In 1963 she was appointed lecturer, progressing to reader. In 1977 she was the first woman to be elected head of the Department of History at the University of Melbourne. Not long before her retirement in 1986, Patrick accepted the role of head of the Italian Department at the university.

She was elected Fellow of the Australian Academy of the Humanities.

Selected works

Personal 
Patrick married James Finlay Patrick in 1944. She died in Canterbury, Victoria on 16 March 2009 and was survived by three of her four children and their families. Her husband predeceased her on 8 November 2004.

References 

1921 births
2009 deaths
University of Melbourne alumni
Academic staff of the University of Melbourne
Australian women historians
Historians of the French Revolution
Fellows of the Australian Academy of the Humanities
Writers from Melbourne
People from Kew, Victoria
Academics from Melbourne
People educated at St Catherine's School, Melbourne